Tłuszcz  (translation: Fat, German: Tluschtsch) is a town in Wołomin County, Masovian Voivodeship, Poland, with 8,015 inhabitants (2014).

Tłuszcz is an important railway junction.

History
Tłuszcz was founded in the 15th century. It was a royal village of Poland, administratively located in the Nur Land in the Masovian Voivodeship in the Greater Poland Province.

During the Polish–Soviet War, in the night of 12–13 August 1920, Tłuszcz was the scene of a skirmish between the Poles and the invading Russians, part of the Battle of Warsaw (1920).

Notable Crimes

The Tłuszcz Rapist
In the year 1783, a man named Alexander Gattner, who migrated from Kraków, Poland, Raped approximately 32 women and 23 men. He was only caught after the mask he used to conceal his identity slipped and his victim noticed him. He was then sentenced to death in May of 1788.

References

External links
 Official town and commune webpage
 Jewish Community in Tłuszcz on Virtual Shtetl

Cities and towns in Masovian Voivodeship
Wołomin County
Warsaw Governorate
Warsaw Voivodeship (1919–1939)
15th-century establishments in Poland
Populated places established in the 15th century